Rosalyn Evette Bryant (married Clark; born January 7, 1956) is an American athlete who competed mainly in the 400 meters.

Born in Chicago, Illinois, she competed for the United States in the 1976 Summer Olympics held in Montreal, Canada in the 4 x 400 meters where she won the Silver medal with her teammates Debra Sapenter, Sheila Ingram and Pamela Jiles. She also finished fifth in the individual 400m there.  It is rumored that the three of the four finishers before her used either steroids or blood doping so many feel that she is truly the second-place finisher of that race. She also competed at the inaugural 1983 World Track and Field Championships, where she represented the US in both the open 400 m and the 4 x 400 meter relay.  She finished 8th in the open 400m, the only American finalist, and anchored the US relay team to a seventh-place finish.  She later became a Los Angeles police officer.

References 
 
 
 

1956 births
Living people
Track and field athletes from Chicago
American female sprinters
Athletes (track and field) at the 1976 Summer Olympics
Olympic silver medalists for the United States in track and field
Medalists at the 1976 Summer Olympics
Athletes (track and field) at the 1979 Pan American Games
Pan American Games medalists in athletics (track and field)
Pan American Games gold medalists for the United States
Universiade medalists in athletics (track and field)
Universiade gold medalists for the United States
USA Outdoor Track and Field Championships winners
Medalists at the 1977 Summer Universiade
Medalists at the 1979 Summer Universiade
Medalists at the 1979 Pan American Games
Olympic female sprinters
21st-century American women